Arena Næstved is a multi purpose arena being built in Næstved, Denmark. First major event in the arena was the 2015 World Women's Handball Championship, played in December 2015. The Dansk Melodi Grand Prix 2023 took place in Arena Næstved.

See also 
 Næstved Stadion

Sports venues in Denmark
Buildings and structures in Næstved Municipality